Agnieszka Radwańska and Urszula Radwańska were the defending champions, but chose not to participate that year.

Jill Craybas and Olga Govortsova won in the final 6–1, 6–2, against Marina Erakovic and Polona Hercog.

Seeds

  Vania King /  Aiko Nakamura (first round)
  Alla Kudryavtseva /  Martina Müller (semifinals)
  Jill Craybas /  Olga Govortsova (champions)
  Anastasia Rodionova /  Arina Rodionova (semifinals)

Draw

Draw

External links
Draw

İstanbul Cup
Istanbul Cup - Doubles

pl:Istanbul Cup 2008